List of Royal Navy ships in North America is an annotated list of some of the Royal Navy ships serving in Canada, the Thirteen Colonies and Caribbean under the North American Station.

List

Shipyards

A list of shipyards of NAS:

 Halifax Naval Yard, Nova Scotia
 Oswego, New York
 Pointe au Baril, Quebec
 Navy Island, Ontario
 Niagara
 Detroit, Michigan
 Oswegatchie
 Carleton Island
 Raven Creek
 Kingston, Ontario
 Prince Edward County, Ontario
 York, Upper Canada
 Amherstburg, Ontario
 Cleveland, Ohio
 Black Rock
 Presqu'Ile, Pennsylvania
 Erie, Pennsylvania
 Quebec, Quebec
 Penetanguishene, Ontario
 Chippawa, Ontario
 Ganaoque, Ontario
 Cobourg, Ontario
 Grand Island, New York
 Montreal, Quebec
 Buffalo, New York
 Sorel, Quebec
 Levis, Quebec
 Stromness
 Sarnia, Ontario

Some ships were shipped over from yards in England:

 Newcastle
 Portsmouth

References

Sources
 USS Growler
 List of Vessels Employed on British Naval Service on the Great Lakes, 1755–1875

North America
North America-related lists